The First Cabinet of Lee Hsien Loong of the Government of Singapore was sworn into office on 12 Aug 2004.

The swearing-in ceremony was held outdoors on the Istana grounds—instead of City Hall where his two predecessors Lee Kuan Yew and Goh Chok Tong held their ceremonies— in order to accommodate 1,400 invited guests representing different demographics of the population. S. Jayakumar was elevated to Deputy Prime Minister, while Tony Tan retained his DPM position — a post he held since his return to Cabinet in 1995. Lee Hsien Loong retained his Finance Minister post held since 2001.

Lee's immediate predecessor, Goh Chok Tong, was named Senior Minister, and ranked second in order of precedence. Goh's predecessor, Lee Kuan Yew, who was the nation's first prime minister and Lee Hsien Loong's father, was subsequently named Minister Mentor.

Cabinet

References

 

Executive branch of the government of Singapore
Lists of political office-holders in Singapore
Cabinets established in 2004
Cabinets disestablished in 2006